Jock McKenzie may refer to:
 Jock McKenzie (Australian footballer) (1911–1989), Australian rules footballer
 Jock McKenzie (rugby union, born 1892) (1892–1968), New Zealand rugby union player
 Jock McKenzie (rugby union, born 2001), New Zealand rugby union player

See also
 Jock Mackenzie (1892–?), Scottish footballer
 Jock MacKenzie (1885–?), Scottish footballer